California's 37th district may refer to:

 California's 37th congressional district
 California's 37th State Assembly district
 California's 37th State Senate district